Chapar Chiri is a small village located in the Mohali district of Punjab, India. It is near Sahibzada Ajit Singh Nagar city and is 14 km west of Chandigarh.

The village is famous due to Fateh Burj (English: The Victory Tower; Punjabi: ਫਤਿਹ ਬੁਰਜ) is the tallest victory tower (minar) in the country. The 420 ft tower is dedicated to the establishment of Sikh rule in India in 1710. It is also known as Baba Banda Singh Bahadur War Memorial. It was here that Banda Singh Bahadur, one of the most respected Sikh warriors, won a decisive battle against Wazir Khan, commander of the Mughal army.[3]

References 

Villages in Sahibzada Ajit Singh Nagar district